Sohn Suk-hee (born 27 July 1956) is a former South Korean anchor and currently serving as general director and president of JTBC and JTBC Studios. He was also a former professor at Sungshin Women's University, Seoul, South Korea.

He is considered one of the most influential figures in South Korean media.

Biography

Early life and education
When Sohn was in elementary school, he lived in Pil-dong, Jung-gu. He was stubborn and tough at the moment. ‘This student is such a thick head’ was written in his report card when he was second grader. He used to play with the orphans near the Toegye-ro, but he was so poor that he was in the similar position with them. Later, his family moved to Seongbuk-gu. After he graduated Sorabol middle school, he entered the Whimoon High School and became a member of the broadcasting club. There, he met Song Sueng Hwan, who planned Nanta. His experience in there played the crucial role of becoming an announcer. In 1976, he entered Kookmin University and studied Korean Literature. Students in Kookmin University called him ‘school uniform’, because he had only worn black clothes. In 1979, he joined the Army in Busan.

1984-2013: MBC
Sohn Suk-hee joined MBC in 1984 as an announcer. In 1985, he became an anchor of 1minute News, Morning News and Work Site 85. He was also an MC of Teenager Special. In 1986, he was an anchor of the Midnight News and Here is MBC. He was an MC of Health at 100 years. In 1987, he became the weekend anchor of MBC Newsdesk until 1989. In 1989, he became the main anchor for the Sunday news programme, News Center and an MC of Scholarship Quiz. In 1990, he became an anchor of the Evening News.

In 1992, he joined the MBC labor union. That same year, Sohn participated in a strike after MBC did not air an episode of famed investigative journalism program PD Note, which was about a prediction about a collapse of rural economy caused by the 1992 Uruguay Round. MBC's CEO at the time, who wanted the ruling party to rule continuously, estimated that the episode would bring disadvantage to the ruling party at the next presidential election. Many MBC journalists decided to go on a strike to clamour for transition of MBC to an impartial broadcasting company, and Sohn was one of them. The strike lasted 52 days, and Sohn was arrested for leading the strike and was detained in Yeongdeungpo detention center with several of his colleagues during the strike. During his detention, he drew attention by speaking, "Do not change what you think is right. Keep your principle before you die." 

In 1993, he came back with being an MC of Making Mornings, Choice, Saturday is Good, and An Opening Dawn. In 1994, he made his return to breakfast television by anchoring for News Wide, and its successors MBC News Today (1995), Good Morning, Korea (1997) and Morning News 2000 (1999-2000). He also hosted both Jazz Concert in the Midsummer Night and the 1994 MBC Riverside Music Festival. He was also the host of Sohn's Morning. In 1996, he was an MC of Police, Finding Suspects. In 1997, he hosted a documentary Sohn Suk-hee's Adventure to America. In 2000, he was a MC of 2000 Today. He was an MC of Wow! What a Wonderful World and Media Criticism in 2001. He also hosted the radio show Sohn Suk-hee's Focus until 2013.  He also hosted 100-Minute Debate, which went on to become one of the most popular talkshows in Korea from 2002 to 2009. In 2010, he narrated the documentary Lion Queen.

On 9 May 2013, Sohn Suk-hee was named the new president of JTBC’s news reporting department. And he said that officially, "I know there is opposition to my choice. But I hope people can wait for me to carry out what I have been contemplating about true journalism. I will do my best to let them understand it in the future."

2013-present: JTBC 
Hong Seok-hyun said JTBC could succeed after several attempts to recruit him. He said that he wants JTBC to be a network with talented people, and Sohn Suk-hee was a man he could find who can broadcast very fair. On 9 May 2013, a report was made that Sohn joined JTBC as president of its news department. In an interview with Sisa IN, he said "The tone would be different from the JoongAng Ilbo. As long as I have the full power of the press section, it seems to me that I will do my job". Starting on 16 September 2013, he became the solo anchor for JTBC News 9, replacing Jun Young-gi and Hwang Nam-hee, who eventually assumed the sub-anchor post on JTBC News Morning&. 

On 16 April 2014, JTBC News 9 reported the sinking of MV Sewol. While he was interviewing Baek Jeom-gi, a shipbuilding engineering professor at Busan University, he was unable to speak for a while. On 18 April,  two days after the incident, Sohn had a ground-breaking interview with deep sea diving expert Lee Jong-in, where he talked about an equipment called the "diving bell" that could be used for search and rescue operations even through tough water conditions. Lee said that he tried to offer the diving bell and other diving equipments to the South Korean coast guard for their search efforts, but they declined him. After the interview was aired, online community sites were flooded with criticisms from outraged netizens in response to the government's slow response towards the incident. Several days later, the South Korean coast guard allowed the use of the diving bell. Sohn Suk-hee was also praised by viewers as he was the only news anchor who covered the search and rescue efforts live from Jindo. From 24 to 29 April 2014, JTBC News 9 was conducted from Jindo, Jeollanam-do. This led to national interest and trust, and recorded audience ratings close to terrestrial broadcasters. On 22 September 2014, JTBC News 9 was reorganized into JTBC Newsroom.

In December 2019, Sohn Suk-hee announced his resignation as anchor of JTBC Newsroom following a large-scale organization reshuffle. He has held this position for six years and four months, and will only focus on CEO duties. His final day was on 2 January 2020, during the second part of its annual New Year's Day debate. That broadcast recorded a rating of 4.9%. The Times They Are a-Changin' was used as its ending theme once more as he resigned from his anchor position.

On 29 November 2020, he was named general director and president of JTBC and JTBC Studios.

Personal life 
He married fellow MBC announcer Shin Hyun-sook in 1987, and has two children with her. Their marriage was one of the few unions between MBC colleagues until Moon Ji-ae and Jeon Jong-hwan married in 2012.

Career

Broadcasting activity

Legacy 
He has been picked as the most influential journalist by Sisa Magazine since 2007. JTBC Newsroom was also chosen as the most influential news program after reporting about the sinking of MV Sewol and the 2016 South Korean political scandal.

References

External links 
 100 Minute Discussion, MC Sohn Resigns
 
 
 
 
 

South Korean announcers
South Korean journalists
Academic staff of Sungshin Women's University
South Korean radio presenters
South Korean television presenters
Living people
Whimoon High School alumni
University of Minnesota alumni
1956 births
People from Seoul
South Korean Roman Catholics
Kookmin University alumni
Munhwa Broadcasting Corporation people
JTBC people
South Korean television executives